Highway 946 is a provincial highway in the Canadian province of Saskatchewan. It runs from Highway 943 to the intersection of Highway 24 and Range Road 3113 at Leoville.

Highway 946 is about 33 km (14 mi.) long.

See also 
Roads in Saskatchewan
Transportation in Saskatchewan

References 

946